Calisto arcas is a butterfly of the family Nymphalidae. It is endemic to Hispaniola, where it is only found in the Cordillera Central's Valle Nuevo area.

The larvae probably feed on bamboo.

References

Butterflies described in 1939
Calisto (butterfly)